Richea procera, the lowland richea,  is a plant in the family Ericaceae, endemic to Tasmania, Australia. It is found in lowland areas of Tasmania with unusually small leaves for the genus Richea. Its leaves are parallel veined, from 10 to 335 mm long, 10 mm wide at the base. It is similar in appearance to the high altitude species Richea sprengelioides.

References

Flora of Tasmania
Endemic flora of Tasmania
procera
Plants described in 1867
Taxa named by Ferdinand von Mueller